Sura Surani (Aymara sura dry jiquima, a species of Pachyrhizus, the reduplication indicates that there is a group of something, -ni a suffix, "the one with a lot of dry jiquima", also spelled Sora Sorani) is a mountain in the Bolivian Andes which reaches a height of approximately . It is situated in the La Paz Department, Sud Yungas Province, Yanacachi Municipality. Sura Surani lies northeast of Mik'aya.

References 

Mountains of La Paz Department (Bolivia)